United States gubernatorial elections were held in 1944, in 32 states, concurrent with the House, Senate elections and presidential election, on November 7, 1944 (September 11 in Maine).

This was the last time Idaho elected its governors to 2-year terms, switching to 4-years from the 1946 election.

Results

See also 
1944 United States elections
1944 United States presidential election
1944 United States Senate elections
1944 United States House of Representatives elections

References 

 
November 1944 events
United States home front during World War II